Hallock is a surname. Notable people with the surname include:
 Ben Hallock (born 1997), American water polo player
 Charles Hallock (1834–1917), American writer and publisher
 Donald H. V. Hallock (1908–1996), American Anglican bishop
 Frank K. Hallock (1860–1937), American neurologist
 Gerard Hallock (1905–1996), American ice hockey player
 Grace Hallock (1893–1967), Americans children's writer
 James L. Hallock (1823–1894), American politician
 James N. Hallock (born 1941), American physicist
 Jeanne Hallock (born 1946), American swimmer
 John Hallock, Jr. (1783–1840), Congressman from New York
 Joseph N. Hallock (1861–1942), American politician and banker
 Kevin Hallock (born 1969), American economist and university president
 Kyle Hallock (born 1988), American baseball coach
 Morris G. Hallock (1926–2018), American politician
 Pamela Hallock (born 1948), American marine biologist
 Peter Hallock (1924-2014), American church music composer
 Richard Hallock (1906–1980), American Assyriologist and Elamitologist
 Ty Hallock (born 1971), American football player
 William Hallock (1857–1913), American physicist